"Te Solte La Rienda" is the second radio single release and sixth track from Maná's second live album, Maná MTV Unplugged in 1999.  "Te Solte La Rienda" is a song originally written by Mexican singer-songwriter in the Ranchera style José Alfredo Jiménez. On the week of September 25, 1999 the song debuted at number twenty nine on the U.S. Billboard Hot Latin Tracks. and just after one week later on October 2, 1999 it reach to its highest point at the number twenty one. It would stayed for a total of 4 weeks spot for one week. In 2002, Lupillo Rivera performed a cover of the song which peaked at No. 12 on the Hot Latin Songs and No. 2 on the Regional Mexican Songs chart.

Charts

References 

1999 singles
Maná songs
Spanish-language songs
Warner Music Latina singles
Songs written by José Alfredo Jiménez
1999 songs